was a Japanese kabuki actor in the Kamigata style and was officially designated a Living National Treasure. Unlike most kabuki actors, he performed both male and female roles, and was renowned as both a skilled wagotoshi (actor of male roles in the wagoto tradition) and onnagata (actor of female roles). He was the fourth in the line of Sakata Tōjūrō, having revived the name after a lapse of over 230 years.

Lineage
Though he bears no direct hereditary connection to the previous lineage of Sakata Tōjūrō which he has revived, Tōjūrō traced his line back several generations within the kabuki world. He is the eldest son of Nakamura Ganjirō II, grandson of Nakamura Ganjirō I, and great-grandson of Nakamura Kanjaku III who was adopted into the kabuki families by Nakamura Utaemon IV.

Tōjūrō's sons Nakamura Ganjirō IV and Nakamura Senjaku III perform as kabuki actors, as do his grandsons Nakamura Kazutarō and Nakamura Toranosuke.

Life and career
He was born on New Year's Eve 1931, the eldest son of actor Nakamura Ganjirō II. He made his first appearance on stage in October 1941, under the name Nakamura Senjaku II, at the Kado-za in Osaka, in the play Komochi Yamanba.

Throughout his career, he has performed primarily in Osaka, performing in both traditional pieces long in the repertoire, and in new kabuki works, primarily by playwright Nobuo Uno. He also frequently took part in revival performances in Tokyo of works by the great bunraku (puppet theatre) playwright Chikamatsu Monzaemon. "The Love Suicides at Sonezaki" (Sonezaki Shinjū), one of the playwright's most famous works, was performed for the first time since before World War II at the Shinbashi Enbujō in 1953. The playwright's 250th memorial service was observed with the revival of Horikawa Nami no Tsuzumi in 1973.

In 1982, Senjaku founded the Chikamatsu-za, a traveling troupe devoted to performing and reviving Chikamatsu's works. These tours have taken him to many cities across Japan, as well as England, the US, China, and elsewhere, not only doing performances, but lectures and cultural workshops as well. The tours frequently feature "The Love Suicides at Amijima" (Amijima Shinjū), and sometimes feature the revivals of plays not performed for centuries. The 1998 tour saw the revival of Keisei Mibu Dainenbutsu which had not been performed since 1702.

Senjaku inherited his father's name and became Nakamura Ganjirō III in November 1990, in a shūmei ceremony at the Kabuki-za in Tokyo. Ganjirō was then named a Living National Treasure (人間国宝, ningen kokuhō) in 1994.

He took the name Sakata Tōjūrō in December 2005. He adopted this new name at the Minami-za in Kyoto.  His goal was  reviving the lineage which had died out over 230 years prior, with the death of Sakata Tōjūrō III in 1774. He sought to not only honor the memory of the line of Sakata Tōjūrō before him, who pioneered, developed, and maintained the Kamigata (Kansai) kabuki tradition, but also as part of an effort to revive and maintain that tradition himself. He is thus, like the other Tōjūrō before him, seen as a symbol of the Kamigata tradition, and as the top actor in that tradition.

In addition to performing, Tōjūrō oversaw and participated in a number of cultural programs to help encourage interest in kabuki, and to maintain the Kamigata tradition. He has also performed abroad, his September 2007 tour taking him to Guangzhou, Beijing, Shanghai, and Hangzhou. In December of that year, he celebrated his 77th birthday (a special birthday in Japan) with a performance of Musume Dōjōji.

Selected works
In a statistical overview derived from writings by and about Sakata Tōjūrō IV, OCLC/WorldCat encompasses roughly 30+ works in 30+ publications in 2 languages and 170+ library holdings .

 近松劇への招待 : 舞台づくりと歌舞伎考 (1989) with Koshirō Uno;
 通し狂言宿無団七時雨の傘 : 三幕六場 (1992) with Shōzō Namiki and Ginsaku Tobe
 一生青春 (1997) with Michiko Toki
 雁治郎芸談 by 中村雁治郎 (2000) Kiyoshi Mizuochi
 恋飛脚大和往来. 封印切 : 一幕 (2000) with Mansaku Tatsuoka
 加賀見山旧錦絵: 通し狂言: 四幕七場 (2004) with Yōtai Yō and Shōichi Yamada
 坂田藤十郎 : 歌舞伎の真髄を生きる (2006)

Honors
 1990 – Medal with Purple Ribbon
 1994 – Living National Treasure
 2003 – Person of Cultural Merit
 2006 – Osaka Culture Prize Cultural Transmission Prize
 2008 – Praemium Imperiale
 2009 – Order of Culture

See also
 Nakamura Kanzaburō

Notes

References

 . (2008). . Tokyo: . 
 Nussbaum, Louis-Frédéric and Käthe Roth. (2005).  Japan encyclopedia. Cambridge: Harvard University Press. ;  OCLC 58053128

External links
  Kabuki 21, Sakata Tōjūrō IV 

1931 births
Kabuki actors
2020 deaths
Male actors from Kyoto
Living National Treasures of Japan
Spouses of Japanese politicians
Recipients of the Medal with Purple Ribbon
Persons of Cultural Merit
Recipients of the Order of Culture
Recipients of the Praemium Imperiale